German submarine U-827 was a Type VIIC/41 U-boat of Nazi Germany's Kriegsmarine during the Second World War. She was ordered on 8 June 1942, laid down on 7 August 1943 at Schichau-Werke, Danzig, West Prussia.

She had two commanders, from 25 May 1944 until March 1945 it was Kapitänleutnant Wilhelm Hunck and then, from 26 April 1945 until 5 May 1945, she had Kapitänleutnant Kurt Baberg.

The U-boat saw no action and was scuttled on 5 May 1945 in Flensburg Fjord. The wreck was broken up in 1948.

Design
Like all Type VIIC/41 U-boats, U-827 had a displacement of  when at the surface and  while submerged.

U-827 was fitted with five  torpedo tubes (four fitted at the bow and one at the stern), fourteen torpedoes, one  SK C/35 naval gun, (220 rounds), one  Flak M42 and two  C/30 anti-aircraft guns. Its complement was between forty-four and sixty.

References

Bibliography

External links

German Type VIIC/41 submarines
U-boats commissioned in 1944
1944 ships
World War II submarines of Germany
Ships built in Danzig
Ships built by Schichau
Operation Regenbogen (U-boat)
Maritime incidents in May 1945